The Atlanta Beat was an American soccer club based in Atlanta, Georgia that competed on a professional level. The team joined Women's Professional Soccer as an expansion team in 2010, and played its home games at Kennesaw State University Soccer Stadium, the result of a public-private partnership between the team and Kennesaw State University. The club took the name and logo of the former Atlanta Beat (WUSA) of the defunct Women's United Soccer Association.

History

Name and colors
The team's name was announced to be the Beat on June 18, 2009. The name was determined by a fan poll, with Attack, Beat, and Storm as the options.

The new Beat logo was the same design as the previous WUSA logo, with the two shades of blue being replaced by Gold and Ferrari Red.

Building the team
Atlanta began building its team at the 2009 WPS Expansion Draft on September 15, 2009, where it selected six players from the existing seven WPS teams, getting four players from the teams that finished first and second in the league's inaugural season.  A week later, Atlanta selected five international players in the 2009 WPS International Draft, including three players from Umea IK, and thus now have exclusive negotiating rights to those players among WPS teams.

Inaugural season

The Beat ended the 2010 season in last place with 5 wins, 13 losses, and 6 ties.

2011 season

The Atlanta Beat started off the 2011 season on April 9 in a game against the Boston Breakers in front of over slightly 4,000 spectators at KLS Stadium. The Beat lost 1–4 to Boston with their lone goal coming from Carli Lloyd in a penalty kick in the 78th minute.

Players

2011 roster

League suspension
On January 30, 2012, Women's Professional Soccer announced suspension of the 2012 season, citing several internal organization struggles as the primary cause. Some of these included an ongoing legal battle with an ex-franchise owner and the lack of resources invested into the league.

See also
 Atlanta Beat (WUSA)

References

External links

  (archived)

 
Association football clubs established in 2010
Women's Professional Soccer teams
Women's soccer clubs in the United States
B
Soccer clubs in Georgia (U.S. state)